Ranelva is a  long river in the municipality of Rana in Nordland county, Norway. It is one of the longest rivers in Nordland county.

Path
The river begins on the Saltfjellet plateau, near the border between Norway and Sweden, at the confluence of the little rivers Randalselva and Gubbeltåga.  The river then flows mainly in a western-southwestern direction.  On its way southwestwards, the river is joined by the river Virvasselva from south. The part of the Ranelva river between its beginning and its joining with Virvasselva is called Ruovadajåhkå in Lule Sami language.

Near Storvollen, the rivers Bjøllåga, Tespa, and Stormdalsåga all join Ranelva from the north and the river Messingåga joins from the south. It continues in a southwestern direction through the Dunderland Valley. The rivers Grønfjellåga and Plura join the Ranelva in this valley.

Southwest of the small village Røssvoll, Ranelva meets the river Langvassåga which empties the lake Langvatnet.  Further down, at Selfors, the river Revelelva (the name of the lowest parts of the river Tverråga) joins the Ranelva.  The river Ranelva empties into the Ranfjorden just south of Ytteren in Mo i Rana.

The river receives water from Storakersvatnet via Rana Hydroelectric Power Station.

Fishing
Ranelva is a popular river for fishing.  It is very rich with salmon and trout. One of the largest salmon tunnels in Norway ( long) is located at the Reinforsen waterfall, and was built in 1956.

Ranelva was cleansed with rotenone in 1996, 2004, and 2005 beneath the Sjøforsen waterfall, in order to remove the salmon parasite Gyrodactylus salaris, which was registered there for the first time in 1975.

Media gallery

Storvoll

Illhøllia

Reinforsen ("Reindeer waterfall")

Selfors

Fossetangen

See also
List of rivers in Norway

References

Rivers of Nordland
Rana, Norway
Rivers of Norway